Sybra donckieri is a species of beetle in the family Cerambycidae. It was described by Maurice Pic in 1939 on the basis of a specimen collected in Palembang, Sumatra. The adult body measures 6 mm long and 2 mm wide.

References

donckieri
Beetles described in 1939